Culham Inlet is an inlet located in the Goldfields-Esperance region of Western Australia. The inlet is also referred to as a coastal salt lake or a transient estuary, as the sand bar that prevents it discharging is almost always closed. The wetlands formed by the system are DIWA listed due to their ecological significance.

The inlet is a wave dominated estuary with a degraded catchment, that is a result of substantial clearing and a saline run-off. Two rivers discharge into the inlet, the Phillips and the Steere.

The dunes are breached intermittently, breaking naturally in 1849, 1872, 1919, 1993 and 2000 and artificially in 1920, each time for a period of 3 to 4 weeks.

The inlet was a river valley prior to 6,500 years ago when a rise in sea levels caused the valley to flood, it would have remained an open estuary until 3,500 years ago when the sand bar at the entrance built up to such a degree that discharge into the ocean was prevented. Then further dune building occurred so that breaks became less frequent.

The area periodically supports a large array of flora and fauna. It is used as a commercial fishery and supplied large catches of Black Bream. The waters also support populations of smaller endemic species such as Goby and two Hardyheads.
A large population of waterbirds is also found in the area with up to 25 species being recorded in the inlet.

The inlet was named by John Septimus Roe, who named the inlet in 1848 after the Toodyay homestead of his son in law, Samuel Pole Phillips.

References

Goldfields-Esperance
Estuaries of Western Australia
Inlets of Western Australia
Former rivers
South coast of Western Australia